Mark Rankin may refer to:

 Mark Rankin (record engineer), British record and mixing engineer and music producer,
 Mark Rankin (vocalist), vocalist with Scottish band Gun